Corticosteroids are a class of steroid hormones that are produced in the adrenal cortex of vertebrates, as well as the synthetic analogues of these hormones. Two main classes of corticosteroids, glucocorticoids and mineralocorticoids, are involved in a wide range of physiological processes, including stress response, immune response, and regulation of inflammation, carbohydrate metabolism, protein catabolism, blood electrolyte levels, and behavior.

Some common naturally occurring steroid hormones are cortisol, corticosterone, cortisone and aldosterone. (Note that cortisone and aldosterone are isomers.) The main corticosteroids produced by the adrenal cortex are cortisol and aldosterone.

Classes

 Glucocorticoids such as cortisol affect carbohydrate, fat, and protein metabolism, and have anti-inflammatory, immunosuppressive, anti-proliferative, and vasoconstrictive effects. Anti-inflammatory effects are mediated by blocking the action of inflammatory mediators (transrepression) and inducing anti-inflammatory mediators (transactivation). Immunosuppressive effects are mediated by suppressing delayed hypersensitivity reactions by direct action on T-lymphocytes. Anti-proliferative effects are mediated by inhibition of DNA synthesis and epidermal cell turnover. Vasoconstrictive effects are mediated by inhibiting the action of inflammatory mediators such as histamine.
 Mineralocorticoids such as aldosterone are primarily involved in the regulation of electrolyte and water balance by modulating ion transport in the epithelial cells of the renal tubules of the kidney.

Medical uses
Synthetic pharmaceutical drugs with corticosteroid-like effects are used in a variety of conditions, ranging from brain tumors to skin diseases. Dexamethasone and its derivatives are almost pure glucocorticoids, while prednisone and its derivatives have some mineralocorticoid action in addition to the glucocorticoid effect. Fludrocortisone (Florinef) is a synthetic mineralocorticoid. Hydrocortisone (cortisol) is typically used for replacement therapy, e.g. for adrenal insufficiency and congenital adrenal hyperplasia.

Medical conditions treated with systemic corticosteroids:

 Allergy and respirology medicine
 Asthma (severe exacerbations)
 Chronic obstructive pulmonary disease (COPD)
 Allergic rhinitis
 Atopic dermatitis
 Hives
 Angioedema
 Anaphylaxis
 Food allergies
 Drug allergies
 Nasal polyps
 Hypersensitivity pneumonitis
 Sarcoidosis
 Eosinophilic pneumonia
 Some other types of pneumonia (in addition to the traditional antibiotic treatment protocols)
 Interstitial lung disease
 Dermatology
 Pemphigus vulgaris
 Contact dermatitis
 Endocrinology (usually at physiologic doses)
 Addison's disease
 Adrenal insufficiency
 Congenital adrenal hyperplasia
 Gastroenterology
 Ulcerative colitis
 Crohn's disease
 Autoimmune hepatitis
 Hematology
 Lymphoma
 Leukemia
 Hemolytic anemia
 Idiopathic thrombocytopenic purpura
 Multiple Myeloma
 Rheumatology/Immunology
 Rheumatoid arthritiseas
 Systemic lupus erythematosus
 Polymyalgia rheumatica
 Polymyositis
 Dermatomyositis
 Polyarteritis
 Vasculitis
 Ophthalmology
 Uveitis
 Optic neuritis
 Keratoconjunctivitis
 Other conditions
 Multiple sclerosis relapses
 Organ transplantation
 Nephrotic syndrome
 Chronic hepatitis (flare ups)
 Cerebral edema
 IgG4-related disease
 Prostate cancer
 Tendinosis
 Lichen planus

Topical formulations are also available for the skin, eyes (uveitis), lungs (asthma), nose (rhinitis), and bowels. Corticosteroids are also used supportively to prevent nausea, often in combination with 5-HT3 antagonists (e.g. ondansetron).

Typical undesired effects of glucocorticoids present quite uniformly as drug-induced Cushing's syndrome. Typical mineralocorticoid side-effects are hypertension (abnormally high blood pressure), steroid induced diabetes mellitus, psychosis, poor sleep, hypokalemia (low potassium levels in the blood), hypernatremia (high sodium levels in the blood) without causing peripheral edema, metabolic alkalosis and connective tissue weakness. Wound healing or ulcer formation may be inhibited by the immunosuppressive effects.

Clinical and experimental evidence indicates that corticosteroids can cause permanent eye damage by inducing central serous retinopathy (CSR, also known as central serous chorioretinopathy, CSC). This should be borne in mind when treating patients with optic neuritis. There is experimental and clinical evidence that, at least in optic neuritis speed of treatment initiation is important.

A variety of steroid medications, from anti-allergy nasal sprays (Nasonex, Flonase) to topical skin creams, to eye drops (Tobradex), to prednisone have been implicated in the development of CSR.

Corticosteroids have been widely used in treating people with traumatic brain injury. A systematic review identified 20 randomised controlled trials and included 12,303 participants, then compared patients who received corticosteroids with patients who received no treatment.  The authors recommended people with traumatic head injury should not be routinely treated with corticosteroids.

Pharmacology
Corticosteroids act as agonists of the glucocorticoid receptor and/or the mineralocorticoid receptor.

In addition to their corticosteroid activity, some corticosteroids may have some progestogenic activity and may produce sex-related side effects.

Pharmacogenetics

Asthma
Patients' response to inhaled corticosteroids has some basis in genetic variations. Two genes of interest are CHRH1 (corticotropin-releasing hormone receptor 1) and TBX21 (transcription factor T-bet). Both genes display some degree of polymorphic variation in humans, which may explain how some patients respond better to inhaled corticosteroid therapy than others. However, not all asthma patients respond to corticosteroids and large sub groups of asthma patients are corticosteroid resistant.

A study funded by the Patient-Centered Outcomes Research Institute of children and teens with mild persistent asthma found that using the control inhaler as needed worked the same as daily use in improving asthma control, number of asthma flares, how well the lungs work, and quality of life. Children and teens using the inhaler as needed used about one-fourth the amount of corticosteroid medicine as children and teens using it daily.

Adverse effects

Use of corticosteroids has numerous side-effects, some of which may be severe:

 Severe amebic colitis: Fulminant amebic colitis is associated with high case fatality and can occur in patients infected with the parasite Entamoeba histolytica after exposure to corticosteroid medications.
 Neuropsychiatric: steroid psychosis, and anxiety, depression. Therapeutic doses may cause a feeling of artificial well-being ("steroid euphoria"). The neuropsychiatric effects are partly mediated by sensitization of the body to the actions of adrenaline. Therapeutically, the bulk of corticosteroid dose is given in the morning to mimic the body's diurnal rhythm; if given at night, the feeling of being energized will interfere with sleep. An extensive review is provided by Flores and Gumina.
 Cardiovascular: Corticosteroids can cause sodium retention through a direct action on the kidney, in a manner analogous to the mineralocorticoid aldosterone. This can result in fluid retention and hypertension.
 Metabolic: Corticosteroids cause a movement of body fat to the face and torso, resulting in "moon face", "buffalo hump", and "pot belly" or "beer belly", and cause movement of body fat away from the limbs. This has been termed corticosteroid-induced lipodystrophy. Due to the diversion of amino-acids to glucose, they are considered anti-anabolic, and long term therapy can cause muscle wasting.
 Endocrine: By increasing the production of glucose from amino-acid breakdown and opposing the action of insulin, corticosteroids can cause hyperglycemia, insulin resistance and diabetes mellitus.
 Skeletal: Steroid-induced osteoporosis may be a side-effect of long-term corticosteroid use.  Use of inhaled corticosteroids among children with asthma may result in decreased height.
 Gastro-intestinal: While cases of colitis have been reported, corticosteroids are often prescribed when the colitis, although due to suppression of the immune response to pathogens, should be considered only after ruling out infection or microbe/fungal overgrowth in the gastrointestinal tract. While the evidence for corticosteroids causing peptic ulceration is relatively poor except for high doses taken for over a month, the majority of doctors  still believe this is the case, and would consider protective prophylactic measures.
 Eyes: chronic use may predispose to cataract and glaucoma.
 Vulnerability to infection: By suppressing immune reactions (which is one of the main reasons for their use in allergies), steroids may cause infections to flare up, notably candidiasis.
 Pregnancy: Corticosteroids have a low but significant teratogenic effect, causing a few birth defects per 1,000 pregnant women treated. Corticosteroids are therefore contraindicated in pregnancy.
 Habituation: Topical steroid addiction (TSA) or red burning skin has been reported in long-term users of topical steroids (users who applied topical steroids to their skin over a period of weeks, months, or years). TSA is characterised by uncontrollable, spreading dermatitis and worsening skin inflammation which requires a stronger topical steroid to get the same result as the first prescription. When topical steroid medication is lost, the skin experiences redness, burning, itching, hot skin, swelling, and/or oozing for a length of time. This is also called 'red skin syndrome' or 'topical steroid withdrawal' (TSW). After the withdrawal period is over the atopic dermatitis can cease or is less severe than it was before.
 In children the short term use of steroids by mouth increases the risk of vomiting, behavioral changes, and sleeping problems.

Biosynthesis

The corticosteroids are synthesized from cholesterol within the adrenal cortex. Most steroidogenic reactions are catalysed by enzymes of the cytochrome P450 family. They are located within the mitochondria and require adrenodoxin as a cofactor (except 21-hydroxylase and 17α-hydroxylase).

Aldosterone and corticosterone share the first part of their biosynthetic pathway. The last part is mediated either by the aldosterone synthase (for aldosterone) or by the 11β-hydroxylase (for corticosterone). These enzymes are nearly identical (they share 11β-hydroxylation and 18-hydroxylation functions), but aldosterone synthase is also able to perform an 18-oxidation. Moreover, aldosterone synthase is found within the zona glomerulosa at the outer edge of the adrenal cortex; 11β-hydroxylase is found in the zona fasciculata and zona glomerulosa.

Classification of corticosteroids

By chemical structure
In general, corticosteroids are grouped into four classes, based on chemical structure. Allergic reactions to one member of a class typically indicate an intolerance of all members of the class. This is known as the "Coopman classification".

The highlighted steroids are often used in the screening of allergies to topical steroids.

Group A – Hydrocortisone type
Hydrocortisone, hydrocortisone acetate, cortisone acetate, tixocortol pivalate, prednisolone, methylprednisolone, and prednisone.

Group B – Acetonides (and related substances)
Amcinonide, budesonide, desonide, fluocinolone acetonide, fluocinonide, halcinonide, and triamcinolone acetonide.

Group C – Betamethasone type
Beclometasone, betamethasone, dexamethasone, fluocortolone, halometasone, and mometasone.

Group D – Esters

Group D1 – Halogenated (less labile)
Alclometasone dipropionate, betamethasone dipropionate, betamethasone valerate, clobetasol propionate, clobetasone butyrate, fluprednidene acetate, and mometasone furoate.

Group D2 – Labile prodrug esters
Ciclesonide, cortisone acetate, hydrocortisone aceponate, hydrocortisone acetate, hydrocortisone buteprate, hydrocortisone butyrate, hydrocortisone valerate, prednicarbate, and tixocortol pivalate.

By route of administration

Topical steroids

For use topically on the skin, eye, and mucous membranes.

Topical corticosteroids are divided in potency classes I to IV in most countries (A to D in Japan). Seven categories are used in the United States to determine the level of potency of any given topical corticosteroid.

Inhaled steroids
For nasal mucosa, sinuses, bronchi, and lungs.

This group includes:

 Flunisolide
 Fluticasone furoate
 Fluticasone propionate
 Triamcinolone acetonide
 Beclomethasone dipropionate
 Budesonide
 Mometasone furoate
 Ciclesonide

There also exist certain combination preparations such as Advair Diskus in the United States, containing fluticasone propionate and salmeterol (a long-acting bronchodilator), and Symbicort, containing budesonide and formoterol fumarate dihydrate (another long-acting bronchodilator). They are both approved for use in children over 12 years old.

Oral forms
Such as prednisone, prednisolone, methylprednisolone, or dexamethasone.

Systemic forms
Available in injectables for intravenous and parenteral routes.

History

Tadeusz Reichstein, Edward Calvin Kendall, and Philip Showalter Hench were awarded the Nobel Prize for Physiology and Medicine in 1950 for their work on hormones of the adrenal cortex, which culminated in the isolation of cortisone.

Initially hailed as a miracle cure and liberally prescribed during the 1950s, steroid treatment brought about adverse events of such a magnitude that the next major category of anti-inflammatory drugs, the nonsteroidal anti-inflammatory drugs (NSAIDs), was so named in order to demarcate from the opprobrium. Corticosteroids were voted Allergen of the Year in 2005 by the American Contact Dermatitis Society.

Lewis Sarett of Merck & Co. was the first to synthesize cortisone, using a 36-step process that started with deoxycholic acid, which was extracted from ox bile. The low efficiency of converting deoxycholic acid into cortisone led to a cost of US$200 per gram. Russell Marker, at Syntex, discovered a much cheaper and more convenient starting material, diosgenin from wild Mexican yams. His conversion of diosgenin into progesterone by a four-step process now known as Marker degradation was an important step in mass production of all steroidal hormones, including cortisone and chemicals used in hormonal contraception.

In 1952, D.H. Peterson and H.C. Murray of Upjohn developed a process that used Rhizopus mold to oxidize progesterone into a compound that was readily converted to cortisone. The ability to cheaply synthesize large quantities of cortisone from the diosgenin in yams resulted in a rapid drop in price to US$6 per gram, falling to $0.46 per gram by 1980. Percy Julian's research also aided progress in the field. The exact nature of cortisone's anti-inflammatory action remained a mystery for years after, however, until the leukocyte adhesion cascade and the role of phospholipase A2 in the production of prostaglandins and leukotrienes was fully understood in the early 1980s.

Etymology
The cortico- part of the name refers to the adrenal cortex, which makes these steroid hormones. Thus a corticosteroid is a "cortex steroid".

See also
 List of corticosteroids
 List of corticosteroid cyclic ketals
 List of corticosteroid esters
 List of steroid abbreviations

References

Corticosteroids
Endocrinology
Hormones
Steroid hormones
Steroids
World Anti-Doping Agency prohibited substances